The Sierra de Huétor  is a mountain range of the Baetic System in Granada Province, Andalusia, Spain.

The range is located to the northeast of Granada city. Its highest point is 1,675 m high Cerro Buenavista.

The Moors used one of the mountain springs in the range, the Fuente Grande in Alfácar, to supply water to the Albaicín in Grenada.
The water was carried along an irrigation channel named Aynadamar.
Traces of more recent history are seen in trenches and fortifications on the Cerro de Maúllo which were used by the fighting armies in Granada during the Spanish Civil War.

Geography
This mountain range includes the deep valleys of the Darro and the Fardes, as well as cliffs, caves, narrow ravines and springs. The mountains are covered in Mediterranean vegetation, with shrubland alternating with holm oak. The range includes part of the municipal term of Huétor Santillán.

Protected areas
Parts of the Sierra de Huétor, along with the neighboring ranges of Sierra de la Alfaguara, Sierra de Cogollos, Sierra de Diezma, Sierra de Beas, Sierra de la Yedra, as well as the southern part of the Sierra de Arana, is a protected area under the name Sierra de Huétor and la Alfaguara Natural Park (Parque Natural de la Sierra de Huétor y la Alfaguara).

Geology
Geologically the mountains belong to the Baetic System and are made up mainly of limestone rock from the Cenozoic and Mesozoic.

See also
Baetic System
Geology of the Iberian Peninsula

References

External links 

Relieve - Geología de Granada
Entorno: Parque natural Sierra de Huétor, Granada
Parque natural de la Sierra de Huétor

Huetor
Huetor
Geography of the Province of Granada